People's Empowerment Party may refer to:

People's Empowerment Party (Barbados) (formed 2006)
People's Empowerment Party (British Virgin Islands) (2014–2016)
People's Empowerment Party (Trinidad and Tobago) (2000–2001)